Barrett Charles Brooks (born May 5, 1972) is a former American football offensive tackle. He recently played for the Pittsburgh Steelers of the National Football League (NFL). He was part of their Super Bowl XL win against the Seattle Seahawks. He attended and played college football at Kansas State University.

High school years
Brooks attended McCluer North High School in Florissant, Missouri and was a student and a letterman in football and basketball.  In football, he was an All-State Honorable Mention selection.

College years
Barrett attended Kansas State University and became a member of Omega Psi Phi fraternity, Delta Delta chapter.

Professional career

Philadelphia Eagles
Brooks played his first four years in the NFL with the Philadelphia Eagles, starting for the first three of those years.

Detroit Lions
Brooks then went to the Detroit Lions in 1999.

New York Giants
He played the 2002 season for the New York Giants.

Pittsburgh Steelers
Brooks reached his final destination when he played for the Pittsburgh Steelers. Brooks suffered a quad injury during the final preseason game of 2006. He was placed on the injured reserve and missed the season as a result.

Personal life
He is married to his wife, Sonji. They have five children: Jasmine Johnson, Romel Brooks, Asia Johnson, Izreal Brooks, and Chyna Brooks. He and his family reside in Voorhees Township, New Jersey.

References

External links
NFL profile

1972 births
Living people
American football offensive tackles
Detroit Lions players
Kansas State Wildcats football players
New York Giants players
Philadelphia Eagles players
Pittsburgh Steelers players
Green Bay Packers players
People from Voorhees Township, New Jersey
Players of American football from St. Louis
Sportspeople from the Delaware Valley